Welfare Jazz is the second studio album by Swedish post-punk band Viagra Boys. It was released on 8 January 2021, through YEAR0001.

Background
The album was produced by Matt Sweeney (Iggy Pop, Queens of the Stone Age), Justin Raisen (Yves Tumor, Charli XCX), Pelle Gunnerfeldt and Daniel Fagerström.

Release
On 15 October 2020, Viagra Boys announced the release of their second studio album. In a press release, lead vocalist Sebastian Murphy said of the album: "We wrote these songs at a time when I had been in a long-term relationship, taking drugs every day, and being an asshole. I didn’t really realise what an asshole I was until it was too late, and a lot of the record has to do with coming to terms with the fact that I'd set the wrong goals for myself."

"Girls & Boys" appears in Grand Theft Auto V on the radio station Kult FM, curated by Julian Casablancas.

Singles
The first single "Ain't Nice" was released on 14 October 2020.

On 2 December 2020, "Creatures", the second single from the album, was released.

The third single "In Spite of Ourselves" was released on 16 December 2020. The single is a cover of American country folk musician John Prine's song of the same name, and features Australian musician Amy Taylor of Amyl and the Sniffers.

The fourth single "Girls & Boys" was released on 6 January 2021.

Critical reception
Welfare Jazz was met with "generally favorable" reviews from critics. At Metacritic, which assigns a weighted average rating out of 100 to reviews from mainstream publications, this release received an average score of 78 based on 16 reviews. At AnyDecentMusic, the album received a 7.8 out of 10 based on 22 reviews.

Writing for Clash, Josh Gray said: "Much like their 2018 debut 'Street Worms', 'Welfare Jazz' concerns itself with the internal lives of the scuzziest dregs of humanity: no-good drifters who lug their vintage calculator collections from couch to couch, self-deceiving junkies who regale hallucinatory conversations they have with their dogs with the listener, alcoholics who scream and ramble on about their problems and other assorted bottom feeders." In a review for Exclaim!, Sarah Morrison gave the album an 8 out of 10, saying "The album occasionally takes the foot off the gas, to great effect. As Viagra Boys have done on previous releases, Welfare Jazz also features a handful of interludes, a breath of fresh air from the smoky, heavy din of its basement mosh pits." She also went on to say the album is "a massive shift from previous releases, both musically and lyrically,

Track listing

Personnel

Musicians
 Sebastian Murphy – vocals (All tracks)
 Henrik Höckert − bass (Tracks 1, 3, 6, 7, 9-13)
 Tor Sjödén − drums (Tracks 1, 3, 5-7, 9-13), percussion (Tracks 4), trumpet (Track 5)
 Daniel Fagerström – guitar (Track 3, 7, 9, 13), vocals (Track 5), mellotron (Track 10)
 Fabian Berglund − guitar (Track 1)
 Benjamin Vallé – guitar (Tracks 5-7, 10-12)
 Pelle Gunnerfeldt – guitar (Track 5, 13), bass (Track 6)
 Oskar Carls − bass (Track 5), guitar (Tracks 1, 3), saxophone (Tracks 1-3, 6-13), flute (Track 5, 10, 12)
 Stella Cartriers – backing vocals (Track 3, 10, 12)
 Edvin Fagerström − percussion (Track 10)
 Samuel T. Herring – backing vocals (Tracks 10, 12)
 Matt Sweeney – guitar (Track 11)
 Elias Jungqvist – piano (Track 6, 7, 10), guitar {Track 9)

Production
 Fabian Berglund − producer (Track 1)
 Daniel Fagerström − producer (all tracks), engineer
 Pelle Gunnerfeldt − producer (all tracks), engineer, mixing
 Matt Sweeney – producer (Track 11)
 Patrik Berger – producer (Track 11)
 Justin Raisen – producer (Track 11)
 Victor Svedberg – artwork
 Robin Schmidt – mastering
 Christoffer Zakrisson – engineer
 David Castillo – engineer

Charts

References

External links

2021 albums
Viagra Boys albums
Year0001 albums